Yuetan Subdistrict is a subdistrict on the western side of Xicheng District, Beijing, China. As of 2020, its total population is 97,771.

The subdistrict was named after the Temple of the Moon within it.

History

Administrative Division 
As of 2021, there are a total of 26 communities within Yuetan Subdistrict:

Landmarks 

 Temple of the Moon
 White Cloud Temple
 Capital Museum

See also
List of township-level divisions of Beijing

References

External links 
 Official website (Archived)

Xicheng District
Subdistricts of Beijing